2815 Soma, provisional designation , is a binary Florian asteroid from the inner regions of the asteroid belt, approximately 7 kilometers in diameter. It was discovered on 15 September 1982, by American astronomer Edward Bowell at Lowell's Anderson Mesa Station in Flagstaff, Arizona, in the United States . It is named for the mechanical puzzle Soma cube.

Orbit and classification 

Soma is a member of the Flora family, a large family of stony asteroids. It orbits the Sun in the inner main-belt at a distance of 1.9–2.6 AU once every 3 years and 4 months (1,219 days). Its orbit has an eccentricity of 0.17 and an inclination of 6° with respect to the ecliptic.

Diameter and albedo 

According to the survey carried out by NASA's Wide-field Infrared Survey Explorer (WISE) with its subsequent NEOWISE mission, Soma measures 6.641 and 7.158 kilometers in diameter and its surface has an albedo of 0.365 and 0.3207, respectively. The Collaborative Asteroid Lightcurve Link adopts Peter Pravec's revised WISE-data, that is, an albedo of 0.2273 and a diameter of 7.067 kilometers with an absolute magnitude of 12.98.

Moon and lightcurve

Primary 

In November 2009, a rotational lightcurve of Soma was obtained from photometric observations by astronomers Petr Pravec, Donald Pray and Peter Kušnirák at Carbuncle Hill Observatory, Rhode Island, and Ondřejov Observatory, in the Czech Republic, respectively. Lightcurve analysis gave a rotation period of 2.7327 hours with a brightness variation of 0.08 magnitude, indicating that the body has a nearly spheroidal shape. The body's spin rate is within the 2.2-to-20 hours range found for most asteroids, about half an hour longer than the so-called fast rotators.

Secondary 

In March 2011, photometric observations revealed that Soma is a synchronous binary asteroid with a minor-planet moon orbiting it every 17.915 hours. The system has a secondary-to-primary mean-diameter ratio of 0.25, which means that satellite's diameter measures approximately 25% of that of Soma (the primary), and translate into a diameter of 1.75 kilometers. The observations also gave a refined rotation period for Soma of 2.73325 hours and an amplitude of 0.07 magnitude. The system has an absolute magnitude of 12.53, and a phase slope parameter (G) of 0.27.

Naming 

This minor planet was named for the Soma cube, following a proposal by Belgian astronomer Jean Meeus (also see ). The Soma cube a dissection puzzle with seven pieces, invented by the Danish mathematician Piet Hein and popularized by American writer Martin Gardner (also see ). The approved naming citation was published by the Minor Planet Center on 10 September 1984.

Notes

References

External links 
 CBET No. 2705, Central Bureau for Astronomical Telegrams, 21 April 2011
 (2815) Soma at johnstonsarchive, datasheet, Robert Johnston
 Asteroids with Satellites, Robert Johnston, johnstonsarchive.net
 Asteroid Lightcurve Database (LCDB), query form (info )
 Dictionary of Minor Planet Names, Google books
 Asteroids and comets rotation curves, CdR – Observatoire de Genève, Raoul Behrend
 Discovery Circumstances: Numbered Minor Planets (1)-(5000) – Minor Planet Center
 
 

002815
Discoveries by Edward L. G. Bowell
Named minor planets
002815
19820915